WXMM-LP is a Variety formatted broadcast radio station. The station is licensed to and serving Galax in Virginia. WXMM-LP is owned and operated by Golden West Media.

References

External links
 

2017 establishments in Virginia
Variety radio stations in the United States
XMM-LP
XMM-LP